Raaz-e-Ulfat is a Pakistani romantic drama television series premiered on Geo Entertainment on 7 April 2020. It is written by Maha Malik, produced by Abdullah Kadwani and Asad Qureshi under 7th Sky Entertainment and directed by Siraj-ul-Haque. It features Shehzad Sheikh, Yumna Zaidi, Komal Aziz Khan and Gohar Rasheed in the lead roles. The supporting cast include Arisha Razi, Hina Khawaja Bayat, Seemi Pasha and Tara Mahmood. It is the story of Mushk, a young and innocent girl who belongs to a conservative family as her life is governed and determined by her father Iftikar Ali. Mushk has no choice other than following the principles set by her father until she meets Sehba and her life changes forever.

It received praise for Zaidi and Aziz's performance as protagonist and antagonist respectively. It is digitally available to stream on YouTube and in some countries on VIU App.

Synopsis
Mushk (Yumna Zaidi) belongs to a conservative family and obeys her father Iftikhar Ali (Tanveer Jamal). She follows the principles set by her father until she meets Sehba (Komal Aziz Khan). Sehba, who likes modern lifestyle, influences Mushk and they become friends. Sehba has a childhood friend named Nomi (Danial Afzal Khan). Nomi is a bad person who is involved with drugs, smoking and gambling. He was friends with Irtiza but they stopped. Sehba really likes Nomi but Nomi doesn't take it seriously. As Sehba starts to develop a liking for  Irtiza (Shehzad Sheikh), she gets jealous when she discovers Mushk and Irtiza's newfound relationship. Hatching vicious plans, Sehba makes Mushk's life difficult and she loses her family and her lover's trust. One day, Nomi and Sehba make a plan to trap Mushk in Nomi's house right before her wedding with Irtiza. Sehba, Under the Fake love of friendship, Picks up Mushk from the Salon she was getting her hair and makeup done in, and peer pressures her in going to a party, where she drugs mushk and locks her in nomis room. Sehba leaves the house while Nomi in a drunken state tries to enter the room Mushk is in. Police raids and arrests everyone in the house. Mushk hides in a cupboard and manages to escape Nomi's house. Meanwhile, Irtiza and Mushk's family are searching for her. Seeing Mushk in a disheveled state, everyone believes the worst of her. Irtiza and his family call off their engagement and Mushk is stood up on her wedding. Then enters Ismael whom Mushk's father asks to marry his daughter and finally Mushk while waiting for Irtiza to show up becomes a reluctant bride of Ismael. Iftikhar Sahib dies of a heart attack sometime later. Ismael and Mushk are living like strangers under one roof with no love in their relationship yet. Sehba succeeds in her attempts to make Irtiza misunderstand Mushk and he decides to marry her as per the wish of both of their families. To spite Mushk, Sehba visits her home to give her the wedding invitation which Mushk decides to attend with Ismael. On the wedding day, Nomi discloses Sehba's shameful secret and conspiracy clearing Mushk's name and leaving Irtiza in agony over losing a pure girl like Mushk. Sehba murders Nomi and ends in hospital with injuries then passes away a few days later after asking forgiveness from Mushk. Mushk chooses to be with Ismael after witnessing his goodness, kind nature and loving attitude. Irtiza is left heartbroken with Mushk forgiving him but refusing to be with him for a second time. Mushk and Ismael live in love and harmony.

Cast

Main cast
 Shehzad Sheikh as Irtiza
 Yumna Zaidi as Mushk (Irtaza's Love Interest)
 Komal Aziz Khan as Sehba (Antagonist) (Dead)
 Gohar Rasheed as Ismail

Recurring cast
 Arisha Razi as Amber (Mushk's sister)
 Hina Khawaja Bayat as Rahma (Mushk's mother)
 Tanveer Jamal as Iftikhar (Mushk's father) 
 Seemi Pasha as Ghazala, Irtiza's mother
 Farhan Ali Agha as Naveed Sehba's father
 Jinaan Hussain as Mohini, Ismail's sister
 Tara Mahmood as Munaza Sehba's mother
 Danial Afzal Khan as Nomi (Antagonist) 
 Nida Mumtaz as Nomi's mother 
 Manzoor Qureshi
Agha Talal
Faisal Bali
Jawed Ali
Hanif Muhammad
Hina Sheikh

Guest appearance
 Kiran Haq as Geeti (Ismail's Wife)
 Anam Tanveer as Bano Aapa; Mushk's neighbour
 Beena Chaudhary as Bano's mother

Awards and nominations

References

External links 
Official website
 Yumna Zaidi Biography

2020 Pakistani television series debuts
Urdu-language television shows
Pakistani drama television series
2020 Pakistani television series endings
Geo TV original programming
Pakistani LGBT-related television shows